Abby Newhook is a Canadian ice hockey forward, currently committed to play for Boston College in 2021.

Career 
Newhook began playing hockey at the age of three. Until 2018, she played for the boys' St. John's Hitmen bantam AAA, serving as team captain in the 2017–18 season. She then moved to the United States to play for the Bay State Breakers and Tabor Academy.

She committed to join Boston College in the United States for college hockey when she was 14, the youngest girl from Newfoundland & Labrador to commit to a Division I NCAA team. She will begin studying at the university in the 2021–22 season.

Personal life 
Her brother, Alex Newhook, also played for Boston College and was selected by the Colorado Avalanche in the first-round, 16th overall, of the 2019 NHL Entry Draft.

References

External links

2003 births
Living people
Canadian women's ice hockey forwards
Ice hockey people from Newfoundland and Labrador
Sportspeople from St. John's, Newfoundland and Labrador